Kazimierz Bartoszewicz (1852–1930) was a Polish writer and historian. He spent at least part of his life in Kraków.

He was son of Julian Bartoszewicz. In his last will he donated his collection to Museum of History and Art in Łódź, which is now named after him.

Works 
 Z wesołych chwil, 1876
 Trzy dni w Zakopanem, 1890
 Lukrecjon, 1898
 Dzieje Insurekcji Kościuszkowskiej, 1908
 Dzieje Galicji, 1917

Quotes 
Stupidity is sticking on,
Understanding hardly grows itself
to the epidemic disease out.

External links
 Online scanned version of 'Dzieje Insurekcji Kościuszkoskiej' (History of (1794) Warsaw Insurrection)

1852 births
1930 deaths
19th-century Polish historians
Polish male non-fiction writers
Polish male writers
20th-century Polish historians